The Department of Industry, Science, Energy and Resources was a department of the Australian Government responsible for consolidating the Government’s efforts to drive economic growth, productivity and competitiveness by bringing together industry, energy, resources and science. The department superseded the Department of Industry, Innovation and Science on 1 February 2020.

It was superseded by the Department of Industry, Science and Resources and the Department of Climate Change, Energy, the Environment and Water on 1 July 2022.
The head of the department at the time of dissolution was the Secretary, David Fredericks.

The Chief Scientist for Australia has reported to the Minister for Science of the day since 1989.

History
Following the appointment of Malcolm Turnbull as prime minister, the Department of Industry, Innovation and Science was established on 21 September 2015, taking on the functions of the previous Department of Industry and Science.

On 20 December 2017, the Department of Industry, Innovation and Science was placed in the newly formed Jobs and Innovation portfolio alongside the Department of Jobs and Small Business.

Scope
As outlined in the Administrative Arrangements Orders, the department is responsible for a wide range of functions including:
 Manufacturing and commerce including industry and market development
 Industry innovation policy and technology diffusion
 Construction industry, excluding workplace relations
 Facilitation of the development of service industries generally
 Trade marks, plant breeders’ rights and patents of inventions and designs
 Anti-dumping
 Civil space issues
 Science policy
 Energy policy

References

2015 establishments in Australia
Australia, Industry, Science, Energy and Resources
Government departments of Australia
Anti-dumping authorities
Industry in Australia
2022 disestablishments in Australia
Defunct government departments of Australia